The Rocky Mountain Hydroelectric Plant is a pumped-storage power plant located  northwest of Rome in the U.S. state of Georgia. It is named after Rock Mountain on top of which the plant's upper reservoir is located. Construction on the plant began in 1977 and it was commissioned in 1995. It is owned by both Oglethorpe Power and Georgia Power which have 75 percent and 25 percent stakes, respectively.

Background
After Georgia Power applied for a Federal Energy Regulatory Commission (FERC) license to operate the plant in 1972, they began to carry out design studies and plans for land acquisition. Construction on the project began in 1977 after the FERC license was granted. The initial phase included the tunnels, penstocks, roads and bridges. Construction was suspended in 1985 when the project was 20 percent complete. In 1987, Oglethorpe Power, who was in need of a pumped-storage plant, began negotiations with Georgia Power to complete the power plant. On 15 December 1988, the two power companies reached an agreement after Oglethorpe received a US$706.8 million loan guarantee. The agreement allowed Oglethorpe to operate the plant and have a 75 percent stake in ownership. Construction on the power plant restarted shortly after the agreement. In 1995 the power plant was completed and the generators commissioned. The project cost $1 billion and it was dedicated on 9 October 1995. The power of the pumps was also increased as well. The upgrade may seem early for the young power plant but the turbines, pumps and inlet valves were purchased before construction was suspended and sat in storage.

Design and operation
As a pumped-storage power plant, it uses two reservoirs to produce electricity and store energy. The upper reservoir stores water (energy) for periods when electricity demand is high. During these periods, water from the upper reservoir is released down to the power plant to produce hydroelectricity. Water from the power plant is then discharged into the lower reservoir. When energy demand is low, usually at night, water is pumped from the lower reservoir back up to the upper reservoir. The upper reservoir can be replenished in as little as 7.2 hours. The same turbine-generators that are used to generate electricity reverse into pumps during pumping mode.

The lower reservoir impounds Heath Creek and is created by two embankment dams and one gravity/embankment composite dam. The other two embankment dams serve as auxiliary dams. Two other auxiliary reservoirs are located adjacent to the lower reservoir and they serve to provide additional water during periods of drought. It is created by four embankment dams. It is created by an embankment dam and an outlet structure. They provide an additional  of water to the lower reservoir. The Auxiliary Pools are also used to sustain wildlife and provide for recreation.

References

External links

Rocky Mountain Hydroelectric Plant at Oglethorpe Power

Energy infrastructure completed in 1995
Dams in Georgia (U.S. state)
Hydroelectric power plants in Georgia (U.S. state)
Pumped-storage hydroelectric power stations in the United States
1995 establishments in Georgia (U.S. state)
Buildings and structures in Floyd County, Georgia
Georgia Power dams
Oglethorpe Power